Jingning County is an administrative district in Gansu, China. It is one of 58 counties of Gansu. It is part of the Pingliang prefecture, with the city of the same name being the prefecture seat. Its postal code is 743400, and in 2006 its population was 463,400 people. Its county seat is Chengguan.

The county government's jurisdiction is over 19 townships, 392 villages, 2320 other communities and 4 neighbourhoods.

History
There is evidence of Neolithic settlements in Jingning. The area was also inhabited during most of Chinese history, including the Three Kingdoms period. Sites have been dated to the Qin Dynasty.

During the Second Sino-Japanese War,  the area was evacuated (1940). The Communist Long March entered Jingning on September 10, 1935. Mao Zedong set up a headquarters in Shi Pu. The Communists left the next month. However, the county was taken under Communist control by the People's Liberation Army  during the Chinese Civil War. PLA troops entered on August 6, 1949. They met little resistance.

Geographical location

Located in the Loess Plateau, it is at an altitude of around 2000 meters. The county has an area of 2193 km². Out of its population of 463400, 444500 (95.92%) are registered as working in agriculture. Ethnic Han and Hui make up most of the population.

Climate
The area is frost-free for 159 days a year, and there are an average of 2238 hours of sunshine a year. The summer is the 'wet season' whereas the spring and the winter are drier.

Administrative divisions
Jingning County is divided to 1 subdistricts, 17 towns  and 7 townships.
Subdistricts
 Chengqu

Towns

Townships

Economy

Among the items it produces are wheat, potatoes, corn, millet, buckwheat, oats, sesame, rapeseed, apples, pears and vegetables. The county is environmentally diverse, with more than 70 species of tree existing within the county, including apple trees, pear trees and the ash tree.  For fruit production, the south of the county is more prevalent for apples, whereas pears are grown in the north. Many other things are cultivated in the county, including lilacs, leeks, garlic and licorice.

Mining also makes up part of the economy; iron ore, lead, zinc, white clay, and limestone are all mined in places such as Gao Hui.

Transport 
China National Highway 312

Natural resources
Wildlife

Jingning has a variety of diverse wildlife; tigers, bears, jackals, deer and Mongolian gazelle all inhabit the county. The county government registers 15 varieties of mammal as well as 27 types of bird in addition to 13 kinds of reptile and amphibians. Animals are also used in agriculture; pigs, cattle and chickens are the main animals used for farming. There are 31 varieties of rose grown in the county, along with many other varieties of wild flower.

Tourism 
Attractions

It was repaired by the Kangxi Emperor between 1692 and 1696. It was granted 'national heritage' status by the central government in 1993. On July 12 every year a festival is held there which usually attracts around 10,000 people.
i
"Jingning Mosque":Another antiquity is the mosque, built in 1536.

"Wutai Mountain":Several famous mountains in Jingning such as the Wutai Mountain(also called Wenpingshan, not the Wutai Mountain in Shanxi Province),.

"Fengtai Mountain":also called Horse Stables Mountain.

"Saving Dragon Mountain"

"Cheng Ji Cultural City": been built to commemorate Fuxi.

"West Ling Mountain Park": is built recent years.

"Jieshipu Red Army Long March Memorial Museum ":to commemorate the Long March of the People's Liberation Army in the county seat.

"Immortal Gap"

"Pearl forest"

Notable people
Luo Yanlin, schoolteacher in Jingning County who was executed on September 10, 2008 for the rape of several schoolchildren.

See also
 List of administrative divisions of Gansu

References

External links
 Official website (Chinese)

 
Jingning County
Pingliang